Esan Marsters (born 17 August 1996) is a professional rugby league footballer who plays as a  for the Huddersfield Giants in the Super League. He has played for the Cook Islands, New Zealand and the New Zealand Māori at international level. 

He previously played for the Wests Tigers, North Queensland Cowboys and the Gold Coast Titans in the National Rugby League.

Background
Marsters was born in Auckland, New Zealand, and is of Cook Island and Māori descent.

He played for Mount Albert Lions in New Zealand, later saying, "I played in the halves growing up. I was a five-eighth, like Benji. That’s where I get my ball skills from. Then I moved over to Sydney from Auckland when I was 17 and got switched to the centres. I was bigger than a lot of the other kids and they wanted to use me out wide." Marsters picked up a contract with the Sydney Roosters to train with their SG Ball team. After spending a season with Roosters SG Ball team he was cut and signed a contract with the Wests Tigers NYC team.

Playing career

Early career
In 2015 and 2016, Marsters played for the Wests Tigers' NYC team.

Marsters played for the Cook Islands in their 2015 match against Tonga. In 2016 he represented the Junior Kiwis in a match against the Junior Kangaroos.

He graduated to the Wests Tigers' Intrust Super Premiership NSW team in 2017.

2017

On 6 May, Marsters represented the Cook Islands in their 2017 Pacific Rugby League Tests match.

In Round 13, Marsters made his NRL debut for the Wests Tigers against the St George Illawarra Dragons, playing off the interchange bench in the 16–12 loss at ANZ Stadium. After playing on the bench for his first 2 games, he was in the starting team for the rest of the season, where he was described as, "a revelation at right centre". He scored 5 tries from 13 games in his rookie year.

2018
Marsters was said to be one of the most improved players in the game in 2018, and, "has been stellar in 2018, to the point he made his New Zealand Test debut and has claims on being one of the form centres right across the NRL." He was one of two players to appear in every game for the Tigers and was their top point-scorer with 124. The Daily Telegraph named in their team of the year, saying, "he was the only centre to crack 3000 metres gained and his 126 metres per match was the biggest average of any centre who played at least 15 games. He also lead all centres in offloads with 49 and was fifth in tackle busts with 65."

2019
In round 4, Marsters missed all three attempts at goal in a 9–8 loss to the Penrith Panthers, despite the Wests Tigers scoring two tries to Penrith's one. In round 9, Marsters scored two tries and kicked 3 goals in a 30–4 win over Penrith. In Round 20, he scored two tries in a 28–4 win over North Queensland at Leichhardt Oval.

On 10 October, the Wests Tigers released Marsters from the final year of his contract. On 14 October, he signed a three-year deal with the North Queensland Cowboys.

2020
In February, Marsters was a member of the North Queensland 2020 NRL Nines winning squad.

In round 1, he made his debut for North Queensland in their 21–28 loss to the Brisbane Broncos. In Round 6, he scored his first try for North Queensland in a 20–36 loss to the Wests Tigers. Following their round 10 loss to the Penrith Panthers, Marsters was dropped by interim head coach Josh Hannay. It was said, "Brought to Townsville to sharpen the Cowboys lacking backline and provide more attacking threats on the edges, Marsters struggled to live up to the hype. Defensive lapses plagued his start at the club, with his combination on the right side with Kyle Feldt the worst in the competition for conceding tries." He made just two more appearances for the North Queensland in 2020, scoring a try in their round 18 loss to the Melbourne Storm. Interim coach Josh Hannay explaining his absence by saying, "He is an extremely gifted player, Esan, but he can clock off at times out on the field. We have had some honest discussions around his work rate and consistency in that area."

2021
On 4 May, after just three games for the North Queensland club in the 2021 NRL season, Marsters was released from his contract and signed with the Gold Coast until the end of the 2022 season.

2022
On 17 September, Marsters signed a contract to join English side Huddersfield starting in 2023.

Achievements and accolades

Individual
Wests Tigers Best New Talent Award: 2018

Team
2020 NRL Nines: North Queensland Cowboys – Winners

Statistics

NRL
 Statistics are correct to the end of the 2020 season

International

Personal life
Marsters' cousin, Steven, is a professional rugby league player for the South Sydney Rabbitohs.

References

External links

North Queensland Cowboys profile
NRL profile

1996 births
Living people
Cook Islands national rugby league team players
Huddersfield Giants players
New Zealand sportspeople of Cook Island descent
New Zealand people of British descent
New Zealand Māori rugby league team players
North Queensland Cowboys players
Gold Coast Titans players
Junior Kiwis players
Rugby league second-rows
New Zealand sportsmen
Rugby league centres
Rugby league players from Auckland
Esan
Wests Tigers NSW Cup players
Wests Tigers players